Peter Anderson (born October 1963) is a former American football player.  He played at the center position and was a consensus All-American while playing for the Georgia Bulldogs in 1985.

University of Georgia
A New Jersey native, Anderson enrolled at the University of Georgia where he played college football from 1983 to 1985 under head coach Vince Dooley.  During Anderson's tenure with the Bulldogs, he played on the 1983 team that was ranked #4 in the country.  As a junior in 1984, Anderson saw the Bulldogs fall to 7–4–1, including a 27-0 loss in the Florida–Georgia rivalry game. The loss to Florida in 1984 ended a six-game winning streak for Georgia.

As a senior, coach Dooley appointed Anderson as captain of the 1985 Georgia Bulldogs football team.  He led an offensive line that allowed the Bulldogs to score 24 points against a Florida team that was ranked #1 in the country.  Following the 1985 victory over Florida, Anderson said, "We restored order."  At the end of his senior season, Anderson was a consensus first-team selection for the 1985 College Football All-America Team.

Later years
After graduating from Georgia, Anderson was drafted in the 10th round (266th overall pick) by the Indianapolis Colts, but he did not appear in any regular season games in the National Football League. He later went into the real estate development business. He moved to Jacksonville, Florida, in the mid-1990s and became associated with Pattillo Industrial Real Estate.  Anderson and his wife, Shawn, have a son, Peter, and three daughters, Tory, Hailey and Susannah.  In 2013, he was induced into the Florida-Georgia Hall of Fame.

References

1963 births
Living people
Place of birth missing (living people)
Players of American football from New Jersey
American football centers
Georgia Bulldogs football players
All-American college football players